EcoBlue is the marketing name for a range of Diesel engines from Ford Motor Company. The EcoBlue engines were developed under the codename "Panther" by Ford engineering teams in the U.K. and Germany, and are expected to succeed the Duratorq diesel engines, offering optimised fuel efficiency and reduced CO2 and NOx emissions.

Also in 2018 Ford launched an even higher spec biturbo  EcoBlue producing  for the Edge Titanium, ST-Line and Vignale SUV in Europe.
 A North American-spec version of the biturbo  EcoBlue was planned debut in the 2020 Transit, but production of the engine was canceled before launch due to the COVID-19 pandemic as well as a lack of market demand to justify federalising the engine.

Claimed improvements 
An all-new engine architecture is claimed to deliver reduced friction and a clean-burning combustion system. The engines will meet Euro 6 emissions standards. Ford says that a 13 percent improvement in fuel efficiency is obtained through friction reduction enhancements.

A new strong lightweight engine block features an aluminium ladder below that reduces noise and vibration. The crankshaft from the piston is offset by 10mm to allow piston side load against the cylinder wall to be reduced hence decreasing friction and wear with the diameter also reduced to improve efficiency.

New belt-in-oil system are being used to drive the cams to reduce friction while the head’s intake system is engineered to equally balance the air between each cylinder.

Centralized eight-hole-nozzle piezo injectors are being used to inject diesel at 2,000 bar, much higher than previous engines.

Engine reference

See also 
 Duratorq diesel engines
 List of Ford engines

References

External links 
 https://media.ford.com/content/fordmedia/feu/en/news/2016/04/26/all-new-ford-ecoblue-engine-is-diesel-game-changer--cleaner--mor.html

Ford engines
Diesel engines